Jean-Pierre Lorit (born 29 November 1960) is a French actor.

His most recognizable role is in the film Three Colors: Red.

In 2005, he performed August Strindberg's Créanciers directed by Hélène Vincent, with Lambert Wilson and Emmanuelle Devos. And he got nominated for a 2006 Molière Awards Best supporting role.

Selected filmography 
 Jake Speed (1986)
 Joan the Maiden, Part 2: The Prisons (1993) directed by Jacques Rivette
 Three Colors: Red (Trois couleurs: Rouge, 1994) directed by Krzysztof Kieslowski
 Nelly & Monsieur Arnaud (1995) directed by Claude Sautet
 An Air So Pure (1997) directed by Yves Angelo
 Alice et Martin (1998) directed by André Téchiné
 Une affaire de goût (2000) directed by Bernard Rapp
 Alejandría (2001) directed by María Lliou
 The White Countess (2005) directed by James Ivory
 Un ami parfait (2006) directed by Francis Girod
 Outside the Law (2010)
 Our Futures (2015)
 The Very Private Life of Mister Sim (2015)

References

External links
 

Living people
Male actors from Paris
French male film actors
French male television actors
French male stage actors
French National Academy of Dramatic Arts alumni
20th-century French male actors
21st-century French male actors
1960 births